Acoustic Sessions is an EP released by Canadian hard rock band Harem Scarem after the successful release of their debut album. It features recordings of selected songs from their self-titled album and was only sold in Canada, having just 500 units available.

Track listing

Personnel 

Harry Hess – lead vocals, guitar, producer
Pete Lesperance – lead guitar, backing vocals, producer
Mike Gionet – bass, backing vocals
Darren Smith – drums, backing vocals

1991 debut EPs
Harem Scarem albums
Warner Music Group EPs